Razian or Raziyan may refer to:
 Razian, East Azerbaijan
 Razian-e Kari, Fars Province
 Razin, Kermanshah
 Raziyan, Kermanshah
 Razian, Zanjan